Pogarsky District is an administrative and municipal district (raion), one of the twenty-seven in Bryansk Oblast, Russia. It is located in the south of the oblast. Its administrative center is the urban locality (a work settlement) of Pogar. Population:   35,588 (2002 Census);  The population of Pogar accounts for 32.2% of the district's total population.

People
 Sol Hurok (1888-1974)

References

Notes

Sources

Districts of Bryansk Oblast